The 1956 Open Championship was held at the Lansdowne Club in London from 21 March - 26 March. Hashim Khan won his sixth consecutive title defeating Roshan Khan in the final.

Hashim Khan set a new record by winning a sixth title overtaking the previous record set by F.D. Amr Bey

Seeds

Results

+ amateur
^ seeded

References

Men's British Open Squash Championships
Men's British Open Championship
Men's British Open Squash Championship
Men's British Open Squash Championship
Men's British Open Squash Championship
Squash competitions in London